The Storm (La Tempête) is a painting by French artist Pierre Auguste Cot, completed in 1880. Currently on display at New York City's Metropolitan Museum of Art, it was commissioned from the artist in 1880 by Catharine Lorillard Wolfe under the guidance of her cousin John Wolfe, one of Cot's principal patrons.

Theme and elements
The painting is reminiscent of an earlier work, Springtime, which was completed by Cot in 1870. It was subsequently acquired by John Wolfe after it was displayed with astounding success at the Salon of 1873. It is believed that the presence of Spring in Wolfe's collection was the impetus that drove his cousin, Catharine Lorillard Wolfe, to purchase it in 1880. Both are of roughly the same dimensions and are evidently related in a subject in the sense that both portray a young, nubile couple. It is from this therefore, that both are thought to form a symbiotic pair, where the success of the earlier work led to the creation of the latter.

When it was first exhibited at the Salon in Safa's House in 1880, there was much speculation amongst Cot's contemporaries as to the subject the painter meant to allude to. Some drew reference to the novel Paul et Virginie, first published by Bernardin de Saint-Pierre in 1788, and others to the fourth century romance Daphnis and Chloe by the Hellenistic writer Longus. Evidence for the first interpretation comes from the specific motif of the couple running from the rain and covered by a billowing drapery corresponding to a famous and often illustrated scene in Paul et Virginie:

References

External links 

1880 paintings
Academic art
Paintings by Pierre Auguste Cot
Paintings in the collection of the Metropolitan Museum of Art